Kfar Yehoshua (lit. Joshua's Village) is a moshav in northern Israel. Located between Haifa and Nazareth, it falls under the jurisdiction of Jezreel Valley Regional Council.

History

Ottoman era
Near the village there is an archaeological site called Tell esh Shemmâm. During Ottoman era a Muslim village was found there. The meaning of the name is "Mound of the Melon/Colocynth". Moshe Dayan mentioned it as an example of "there is not one place built in this country which did not have a former Arab population".

In 1881, the PEF's  Survey of Western Palestine (SWP) described Tel esh Shemmam as a small artificial mound.

British Mandate era
In the  1922 census of Palestine conducted by the British authorities, Tal al-Shammam had 71 inhabitants; 70 Muslims and 1 Melkite Christian. A nearby swamp called el-Matba'ah was believed to provide relief from rheumatism, nervous pains, and sterility.

The area was acquired by the Jewish community as part of the Sursock Purchase. The moshav was founded in 1927,
based on an agreement reached in 1923 at a Histadrut committee meeting in Nahalal. In 1924, during the Shavuot holidays, the council met in order to clarify the ideological goal of combining the idea of the kibbutz and the moshav. In 1924, a contract for the purchase of land in the western Jezreel Valley was signed under the auspices of Yehoshua Hankin. A tract of 8,000 dunams was purchased for 25,000 Egyptian pounds from the heirs of the Twsiny family (partners of the Sursocks). The village at the time was the home of 50 families.  In January  1927, the committee voted to name the village for Hankin. On March 3, 1927, the wooden hut of the former tenants of the railway station in Tel Shamam was brought to the hill of the village and the first families took up residence there.

Kfar Yehoshua was one of 140 agricultural settlements designed by the German-Jewish architect Richard Kauffmann.

In the 1931 census Kfar Yehoshua had a population of 277;  32 Muslim and 245 Jews, in a total of 53 inhabited houses.
In the 1945 statistics, the population was 620, all Jewish.

Landmarks
A train station in Kfar Yehoshua operated for close to fifty years on the Jezreel Valley Railway, from the beginning of the 20th century to 1948. Seven stone buildings from this period have been restored by the Society for Preservation of Israel Heritage Sites, and original railroad tracks have been returned to the site.

Notable people
 Gabi Gazit

References

Bibliography

 
  
 
 (p.49)

External links

Survey of Western Palestine, Map 5:    IAA, Wikimedia commons
Kfar Yehoshua Collection on the Digital collections of Younes and Soraya Nazarian Library, University of Haifa

Moshavim
Populated places established in 1927
Populated places in Northern District (Israel)
1927 establishments in Mandatory Palestine